The SY, and HY series were early anti-ship cruise missiles (ASCM) developed by the People's Republic of China from the Soviet P-15 Termit missile. They entered service in the late 1960s and remained the main ASCMs deployed by the People's Liberation Army Navy through the 1980s. The missiles were used by the PRC and export customers to develop land-attack missiles.

The name Silkworm is popularly used for the entire SY and HY family. As a NATO reporting name it applies only to the land-based variant of the HY-1.

Development

Chinese preparations were underway before receiving the first P-15s and related technical data from the Soviets in 1959. On 8 October 1956, the Fifth Academy was founded - with Qian Xuesen as director - to pursue missile development, and in March 1958 a cruise missile test site was selected at Liaoxi in Liaoning. The first successful missile test was conducted in November 1960 after the withdrawal of Soviet advisors in September due to the Sino-Soviet split. The P-15 was copied to become the SY-1. Production started at the Nanchang Aircraft Manufacturing Company in October 1963 and the first successful test occurred in 1965; production was approved August 1967 and the SY-1 entered service by the end of the decade.

The SY-1 was developed into the improved HY-1; the HY-1 was successfully tested in December 1968 and entered service in 1974.

Operational history

Iran–Iraq War
The Silkworm gained fame in the 1980s when it was used by both sides in the Iran–Iraq War; both countries were supplied by China. During 1987, Iran launched a number of Silkworm missiles from the Faw Peninsula, striking the American-owned, Liberian-flagged tanker Sungari and U.S.-flagged tanker Sea Isle City in October 1987. Five other missiles struck areas in Kuwait earlier in the year. In October 1987, Kuwait's Sea Island offshore oil terminal was hit by an Iranian Silkworm, which was observed to have originated from the Faw peninsula. The attack prompted Kuwait to deploy a Hawk missile battery on Failaka Island to protect the terminal. In December 1987, another Iranian Silkworm was fired at the terminal, but it struck a decoy barge instead.

Persian Gulf War
On February 25, 1991 during Operation Desert Storm, a shore-based Iraqi launcher fired two Silkworm missiles at the USS Missouri which was in company with the USS Jarrett and HMS Gloucester. A Sea Dart missile from HMS Gloucester shot down one Silkworm and the other missed, crashing into the ocean. Royal Air Force officers subsequently recovered an HY-2 missile at Umm Qasr in southern Iraq. It is currently displayed at the RAF Museum Cosford.

Iraq War
During the 2003 invasion of Iraq, Iraq used the Silkworm (HY-2 Seersucker) as a surface to surface missile by firing at least two of them at the coalition positions in Kuwait.

Variants
SY-1
License produced version of the P-15 Termit. NATO reporting name CSS-N-1 Scrubbrush.
SY-2
HY-1
NATO reporting names CSS-N-2 Safflower(ship-based) and CSSC-2 Silkworm (land-based.)
HY-2
NATO reporting names CSS-N-3 Seersucker(ship-based) and CSSC-3 Seersucker (land-based.)
HY-3
Unsuccessful supersonic variant.
HY-4
Powered by a WP-11 turbojet, a reverse-engineered Teledyne-Ryan J69-T-41A. Used for LACM development. NATO reporting name Sadsack.
YJ-63
Air-launched LACM sharing visual characteristics of the HY-2, HY-4, and YJ-6. 200 km range.
AG-1
Longer-ranged variant of the HY-2 developed by North Korea.

Operators

Current operators
 (made under license)
 (Type 053H)

 (as of Saddam's Era)

References

Sources

External links

 Federation of American Scientists page on HY-1
 Federation of American Scientists page on HY-2

Anti-ship cruise missiles of the People's Republic of China
China–Soviet Union relations
Guided missiles of the People's Republic of China